Empress Li (960–1004) was an empress consort of ancient China's Northern Song dynasty, married to Emperor Taizong. After his death, she was the empress dowager for her stepson Emperor Zhenzong.

Biography
The second daughter of Song general Li Chuyun, it was arranged that she marry Zhao Guangyi by Zhao Guangyi's elder brother Emperor Taizu of Song. After Emperor Taizu's death in 976, Zhao Guangyi became Emperor Taizong, and Lady Li officially became his imperial consort in 978. She was named the empress in 984.

Titles 

 During the reign of Emperor Taizu of Song (4 February 960– 14 November 976):
 Lady Li (李氏; from 960
 Princess Consort (王妃; fron 976)
 During the reign of Emperor Taizong of Song (15 November 976 – 8 May 997)
 Empress (賀氏; from 984)
During the reign of Emperor Zhenzong of Song (8 May 997 – 23 March 1022 )
 Empress Dowager (皇太后: from 997)
Empress Mingde (孝德皇后; from 1004)

Issue
As empress:
unnamed son (died soon after birth)

Notes and references

Sources
  

1004 deaths
Song dynasty empresses
960 births
Song dynasty empresses dowager
10th-century Chinese women
10th-century Chinese people
11th-century Chinese women
11th-century Chinese people
People from Changzhi